Les Sources is a regional county municipality in the Estrie region of Quebec, Canada. The seat is the city of Val-des-Sources. Before April 22, 2006 it was known as Asbestos regional county municipality, and before August 1990 it was known as L'Or-Blanc regional county municipality.

The Asbestos strike, a critical part of Quebec's labour history, occurred in the region.

Subdivisions
There are 7 subdivisions within the RCM:

Cities & Towns (2)
 Danville
 Val-des-Sources

Municipalities (4)
 Ham-Sud
 Saint-Adrien
 Saint-Georges-de-Windsor
 Wotton

Townships (1)
 Saint-Camille

Demographics

Population
Population trend:

Language
Mother tongue (2016)

Transportation

Access Routes
Highways and numbered routes that run through the municipality, including external routes that start or finish at the county border:

 Autoroutes
 None

 Principal Highways
 

 Secondary Highways
 
 
 
 

 External Routes
 None

Attractions
 Burbank Pond Natural Interpretation Centre (Danville)
 Asbestos Musical Camp (Val-des-Sources)
 JM Asbestos Mine Visit (Val-des-Sources)
 The Little Happiness of Saint-Camille (Saint-Camille)
 Mineralogical Museum, and Museum Mine History (Val-des-Sources)
 Mont-Ham full air Centre (Saint-Joseph-de-Ham-Sud)

See also
 List of regional county municipalities and equivalent territories in Quebec

References

External links
 MRC des Sources.
 Tourisme dans La MRC des Sources
 Portail Régional